Arsène Lupin is a French TV show (1971 - 1974) which was co-produced with French, German, Canadian, Belgian, Dutch, Swiss, Italian and Austrian TV stations. It is loosely based on the novels by Maurice Leblanc featuring master thief Arsène Lupin who was featured in 17 novels and 39 novellas.

Development
Georges Descrières' portrayal of Arsène Lupin showed more similarity to Graf Yoster than to Maurice Leblanc's original depiction of his character. He behaved in the first place as a perfect gentleman who never got angry. Besides rescuing damsels in distress Lupin took on (other) criminals, competing with their wit and intelligence. Either he stole paintings from rich people who had to be considered white-collar criminals or he acted as a detective who derailed criminal schemes. Among the guest stars were German actors such as Günter Strack and Sky du Mont.

Jean-Paul Salomé said in his commentary on the DVD version of his film, film Arsène Lupin (2004), that he had liked this TV series as a child.

German TV, one of the investors, would broadcast the show eventually between 18:00-20:00 o'clock because it was only allowed to show commercials within that timeslot. For them to get a financial return on investment the show had to be appropriate for families and also for children who would watch it alone. Subsequently, it was nearby to ask to defuse and flatten some of Leblanc's plots in order to avoid possible complaints that could force the station to broadcast the show beyond the "Vorabendprogramm".

Cast
 Georges Descrières ... Arsène Lupin
 Yvon Bouchard ... Grognard
 Roger Carel ... Guerchard
 Henri Virlojeux ... Herlock Sholmès

Theme songs

Series 1 ending theme

"L'Arsène" 
Music by Jean-Pierre Bourtayre

Lyrics by Jacques Lanzmann

Performed by Jacques Dutronc

Series 2 ending theme

"Gentleman Cambrioleur" 
Music by Jean-Pierre Bourtayre

Lyrics by Jacques Lanzmann

Performed by Jacques Dutronc

References

External links
 

French crime drama television series
Italian television series
Italian crime television series
Television shows based on French novels
1970s French television series
1971 French television series debuts
1974 French television series endings
Period television series
Television shows based on Arsène Lupin